Unai García Lugea (born 3 February 1992) is a Spanish professional footballer who plays for CA Osasuna as a defender.

Club career
Born in Ezcároz – Ezkaroze, Navarre, García finished his youth career with CA Osasuna, making his senior debut in the 2011–12 season with the reserves in the Segunda División B. On 1 June 2013, he made his main-squad and La Liga debut, starting in a 4–2 away defeat against Real Madrid and being booked in the match.

On 28 January 2015, García was loaned to CD Tudelano until June. Upon his return, he was regularly used by manager Enrique Martín, and scored his first professional goal on 15 November in a 2–1 home win over RCD Mallorca.

García netted three times from 37 appearances in the 2018–19 campaign, as the club returned to the top flight as champions. He scored his first goal in the competition on 9 February, but in a 4–1 home loss to Real Madrid.

Personal life
García's younger brother, Imanol, is also a footballer. A midfielder, he too was groomed at Osasuna.

Career statistics

Club

Honours
Osasuna
Segunda División: 2018–19

References

External links

1992 births
Living people
People from Roncal-Salazar
Spanish footballers
Footballers from Navarre
Association football defenders
La Liga players
Segunda División players
Segunda División B players
Tercera División players
CA Osasuna B players
CA Osasuna players
CD Tudelano footballers